Bebek Bay is a small bay on the Bosphorus, in the Beşiktaş district of Istanbul. It was formerly a resort area that was home to a palace of the Ottoman sultan.

See also
 Bebek, Istanbul

References

Bays of Turkey
Bosphorus
Beşiktaş
Landforms of Istanbul Province